Pasqualino Moretti (born 14 March 1947) is a former Italian cyclist. He competed in the team time trial at the 1972 Summer Olympics.

References

External links
 

1947 births
Living people
Italian male cyclists
Olympic cyclists of Italy
Cyclists at the 1972 Summer Olympics
Cyclists from Cremona